Will Evans (born 4 May 2001) is a Wales international rugby league footballer who plays as a  for the Widnes Vikings in the Betfred Championship. 

He previously played for Whitehaven in the Championship.

Background
Evans was born in Australia. He is of Welsh descent.

Playing career

Club career
Evans played in 1 games for the Burleigh Bears in the 2020 Queensland Cup.

In the 2022 season he made 26 appearances and scored eight tries for Whitehaven. 

On 12 October 2022 it was announced that he had signed a one-year deal with the Widnes Vikings.

International career
Evans played for Wales at the 2019 Rugby League World Cup 9s.

He made his full international debut in June 2022 against France at the Stadium Municipal d'Albi in Albi.

In 2022 Evans was named in the Wales squad for the 2021 Rugby League World Cup.

References

External links
Wales profile
Wales RL profile
Burleigh Bears profile

2001 births
Living people
Australian rugby league players
Australian people of Welsh descent
Burleigh Bears players
Wales national rugby league team players
Rugby league centres
Whitehaven R.L.F.C. players
Widnes Vikings players